Silistra Province (transliterated Oblast Silistra, former name Silistra okrug) is a province of Bulgaria, named after its main city - Silistra. It is divided into seven municipalities with a total population, as of December 2009, of 127,659. The province is part of Southern Dobrudja, which was part of Romania until 1940.

Silistra Province is a traditionally agricultural province, mainly because of its fertile soil. The province is known for its pelicans and apricot brandy.

Besides the administrative centre, other municipalities are Alfatar, Dulovo, Glavinitsa, Kaynardzha, Sitovo, and Tutrakan.

Municipalities

The Silistra Province contains 7 municipalities ( - plural:). The following table shows the names of each municipality in English and Cyrillic, the main town (in bold) or village, and the population of each as of December 2009.

Demographics

The following table represents the change of the population in the province after World War II:

Ethnic groups

Total population (2011 census): 119 474

Ethnic groups (2011 census):
Identified themselves: 111,590 persons:
 Bulgarians: 64,050 (57.40%)
 Turks:  40,272 (36.09%)
 Romani: 5,697 (5.11%)
Others and indefinable: 1,571 (1.41%)

Religion

Religious adherence in the province according to 2001 census:

See also
Provinces of Bulgaria
List of villages in Silistra Province

References

 
Provinces of Bulgaria
Turkish communities outside Turkey